Lithodryas is a prehistoric genus of butterflies in the family Lycaenidae. It was introduced as a replacement for Samuel Hubbard Scudder's genus Lithopsyche, which is invalid as a homonym, as another fossil lepidopteran genus had been described under the same name shortly before Scudder established his genus.

The type species was found in Latest Eocene-aged deposits at Florissant.

References

†
Eocene insects
Fossil Lepidoptera
Prehistoric insects of North America
†